Puerto Rico Highway 12 (PR-12), also called Avenida Malecón, and Avenida Santiago de los Caballeros, is a 6.4-kilometer, limited-access highway entirely located within the city limits of Ponce, Puerto Rico, and connecting Puerto Rico Highway 14 to the La Guancha area in Barrio Playa in Ponce. It is similar to a freeway but has one traffic light near its intersection with PR-14. In addition to its northern and southern terminus, the highway has four full interchange exits: PR-52, PR-2, PR-133/Calle Comercio, and Avenida Las Américas. Since PR-12's southern terminus is at the Port of Ponce, its traffic volume is expected to grow as construction in the new Port of the Americas is completed.

History

The 2.5 kilometer section of this road, from the Ponce Bypass to just a few feet from the Caribbean Sea at PR-123, was the first segment built; it was built in 1960. It was called "Avenida Malecón" (Pier Avenue), as it led from the then-urbanized area of Ponce to the Ponce wharf. The segment north of PR-12's intersection with PR-2, that is, between PR-2 and Avenida Tito Castro was built in the 1990s, and completed in 2002, as part of the Ponce en Marcha project.

PR-12 used to be signed as part of 'PR-14' before construction of the new PR-10 took place. The PR-14 signing has since been moved into another route (ending at Monumento a la abolición de la esclavitud, near downtown Ponce, while the PR-12 signing was assigned to the southernmost 5.28 kilometers of the old PR-14 route. As of 2008, the Puerto Rico Department of Transportation and Public Works had not yet updated the signing on the road, but by 2011 it had.

Major intersections

See also

 List of highways in Ponce, Puerto Rico
 List of highways numbered 12
 List of streets in Ponce, Puerto Rico

Notes

References

012
Roads in Ponce, Puerto Rico

External links